The Women's CEV Cup, formerly known as CEV Cup Winners' Cup (from 1972 to 2000) and CEV Top Teams Cup (from 2000 to 2007), is the second-top official competition for women's volleyball clubs of Europe and takes place every year.

Results summary

Cup Winners Cup

Top Teams Cup

CEV Cup

Note: The third place match was abolished in 2010. The table's column "Third" display the losing semifinalists from season 2010–11 onwards.

Titles by club

Titles by country
Notes: 
1. For the purpose of keeping historical event accuracy, historical countries names are used in this table.  
2. The column "Third place" includes results until 2010 as the third place match was abolished since then.

MVP by edition 
2003–04 – 
2004–05 – 
2005–06 – 
2006–07 – 
2007–08 – 
2008–09 – 
2009–10 – 
2010–11 – 
2011–12 – 
2012–13 – 
2013–14 – 
2014–15 – 
2015–16 – 
2016–17 – 
2017–18 – 
2018–19 – 
2020–21 – 
2021–22 –

All-time team records 
Winners and finalists by city since 1972/1973

Various statistics since 2006/2007

(Based on W=2 pts and D=1 pts)

See also
 Men's 
 CEV Champions League
 CEV Challenge Cup
 CEV Cup
 FIVB Volleyball Men's Club World Championship
 Women's
 CEV Women's Champions League
 CEV Women's Challenge Cup
 CEV Cup Women's
FIVB Volleyball Women's Club World Championship

References
 European Cups
 CEV 40th Anniversary Book - European Cups

Citations

External links
 CEV Website

 
CEV Cup
European volleyball records and statistics
Recurring sporting events established in 1972
1972 establishments in Europe
Multi-national professional sports leagues